On June 23, 1942 the experimental prototype L-IV nuclear reactor was in the first nuclear accident in history, consisting of a steam explosion and reactor fire in Leipzig, Nazi Germany.

Shortly after the Leipzig L-IV atomic pile—worked on by Werner Heisenberg and Robert Döpel—demonstrated Germany's first signs of neutron propagation, the device was checked for a possible heavy water leak. During the inspection, air leaked in, igniting the uranium powder inside. The burning uranium boiled the water jacket, generating enough steam pressure to blow the reactor apart. Burning uranium powder scattered throughout the lab causing a larger fire at the facility.

This happened after 20 days of operation when Werner Paschen opened the machine at the request of Döpel after blisters formed at the gasket. As glowing uranium powder shot to the 6 meter high ceiling and the apparatus heated up to 1000 degrees, Heisenberg was asked for help but could not provide it.

The experiment
Results from the L-IV trial, in the first half of 1942, indicated that the spherical geometry, with five tonnes of heavy water and 10 tonnes of metallic uranium, could sustain a fission reaction. So, "the Germans were the first physicists in the world, with their Leipzig pile L-IV, to achieve positive neutron production." The results were set forth in an article by Robert Döpel, Klara Döpel and W. Heisenberg. The article was published at first in the Kernphysikalische Forschungsberichte (Research Reports in Nuclear Physics), a classified internal reporting vehicle of the Uranverein.

The Leipzig research group was led by Heisenberg until 1942 who in winter 1939/1940 reported on the possibilities and feasibility of energy extraction from uranium for a uranium reactor and nuclear bomb. After the report Heisenberg withdrew from practical experiments and left the execution of the experiments L-I, L-II, L-III and L-IV mostly up to his coworkers. The accident ended the Leipzig uranium projects.

See also

 German nuclear weapons program
Nuclear safety and security
 Nuclear power in Germany
 Lists of nuclear disasters and radioactive incidents

References

Nuclear accidents and incidents
Nuclear history of Germany
1942 in Germany
1942 disasters in Germany
History of Leipzig